Adam Gnezda Čerin (born 16 July 1999) is a Slovenian professional footballer who plays as a midfielder for Super League Greece club Panathinaikos and the Slovenia national team.

Club career
On 2 July 2022, Gnezda Čerin left 1. FC Nürnberg and signed a four-year contract with Super League Greece side Panathinaikos for an alleged fee of €700,000.

International career
Gnezda Čerin made his debut for Slovenia on 11 November 2020 in a friendly game against Azerbaijan. He started the game and was substituted at half-time.

Career statistics

Club

International

Scores and results list Slovenia's goal tally first, score column indicates score after each Gnezda Čerin goal.

References

External links
Adam Gnezda Čerin at NZS 

1999 births
Living people
People from Postojna
Association football midfielders
Slovenian footballers
Slovenian expatriate footballers
Slovenia youth international footballers
Slovenia under-21 international footballers
Slovenia international footballers
Slovenian PrvaLiga players
2. Bundesliga players
Croatian Football League players
Super League Greece players
NK Domžale players
1. FC Nürnberg players
HNK Rijeka players
Panathinaikos F.C. players
Slovenian expatriate sportspeople in Germany
Expatriate footballers in Germany
Slovenian expatriate sportspeople in Croatia
Expatriate footballers in Croatia
Slovenian expatriate sportspeople in Greece
Expatriate footballers in Greece